Mereni is a commune and village in the Anenii Noi District of Moldova.

References

Communes of Anenii Noi District
Kishinyovsky Uyezd